The Mesquite Hills are a low mountain range in the Mojave Desert, in San Bernardino County, southern California.

The hills are protected within the Mojave National Preserve.

History
The Mesquite Hills were on the old route of the Tonopah and Tidewater Railroad, with the line's settlement of Crucero in them.

See also
Category: Mojave National Preserve
Category: Mountain ranges of the Mojave Desert

References 

Mountain ranges of the Mojave Desert
Hills of California
Mojave National Preserve
Mountain ranges of San Bernardino County, California
Tonopah and Tidewater Railroad
Mountain ranges of Southern California